New Nietzsche Studies is a peer-reviewed academic journal devoted to scholarly examination of Friedrich Nietzsche's thought and edited by Babette Babich and David B. Allison. Established in 1996, it is the journal of the Nietzsche Society. The journal is abstracted and indexed in the International Philosophical Bibliography, Philosopher's Index, Philosophy Research Index, and PhilPapers. New Nietzsche Studies is produced at Fordham University and all issues are available online from the Philosophy Documentation Center.

See also 
 List of philosophy journals

References

External links 
 
 Nietzsche Society

Biannual journals
English-language journals
Publications established in 1996
Philosophy Documentation Center academic journals
Works about Friedrich Nietzsche
Nietzsche, Friedrich